Stone is a civil parish in the Borough of Stafford, Staffordshire, England.  It contains 75 listed buildings that are recorded in the National Heritage List for England. Of these, six are at Grade II*, the middle of the three grades, and the others are at Grade II, the lowest grade.  Stone is a market town, and most of its listed buddings are houses and cottages, shops, offices, and public houses.  The Trent and Mersey Canal passes through the town, and the listed buildings associated with this are bridges, locks, a warehouse, a milepost and items in the boatyard.  The other listed buildings include churches and structures in churchyards, road bridges, former mills, a former hospital, a milestone, a railway station and other buildings associated with the railway, schools, and a war memorial.  The listed buildings in the rural areas around the town of Stone are in Listed buildings in Stone Rural.


Key

Buildings

References

Citations

Sources

Lists of listed buildings in Staffordshire
Listed